"Nigger Blues", written by Le Roy "Lasses" White (1888 – 1949), was one of the first blues songs published. Copyrighted by the Texas-born White in 1912, it was first titled "Negro Blues", but for unknown reasons when White published it in 1913, he retitled it.

In addition to the importance of the "Nigger Blues" for being one of the first published blues songs and written by one of the first composers of twelve-bar blues, it was the first whose lyrics were in what would become the standard blues form used by the 1920s vaudeville performers and found in the folk blues songs collected and recorded in the 1930s. e.g.:

and:

Early recordings

References

Bibliography
Cylinder Preservation and Digitization Project. "Nigger Blues". University of California, Santa Barbara.
Carlin, Richard. Country Music: A Biographical Dictionary. New York: Routledge (2002) 
Gracyk, Tim. Popular American Recording Pioneers: 1895-1925. New York: Routledge (2000).
Monge, Luigi; David Evans. "New Songs of Blind Lemon Jefferson". Journal of Texas Music History 3:2 (Fall 2003).
Oliver, Paul; Harrison, Max; Bolcom, William. The New Grove Gospel, Blues and Jazz: With Spirituals and Ragtime. New York: W. W. Norton & Company (1997).
Rust, Brian. The Columbia Master Book Discography. Westport, CT: Greenwood Press (1999)
White, Le Roy "Lasses". "Nigger Blues" (sheet music). Dallas, TX: Bush & Gerts (1913).

External links
"Nigger Blues"; E. Azalia Hackley Collection, Detroit Public Library.

Blues songs
1912 songs